Ecuador competed at the 2014 Summer Youth Olympics, in Nanjing, China from 16 August to 28 August 2014.

Medalists
Medals awarded to participants of mixed-NOC (Combined) teams are represented in italics. These medals are not counted towards the individual NOC medal tally.

Athletics

Ecuador qualified four athletes.

Qualification Legend: Q=Final A (medal); qB=Final B (non-medal); qC=Final C (non-medal); qD=Final D (non-medal); qE=Final E (non-medal)

Boys
Track & road events

Girls
Track & road events

Beach Volleyball

Ecuador qualified a girls' team from their performance at the 2014 CSV Youth Beach Volleyball Tour.

Canoeing

Ecuador qualified one boat based on its performance at the 2013 World Junior Canoe Sprint and Slalom Championships.

Girls

Cycling

Ecuador qualified a boys' and girls' team based on its ranking issued by the UCI.

Team

Mixed Relay

Equestrian

Ecuador qualified a rider.

Judo

Ecuador qualified one athlete based on its performance at the 2013 Cadet World Judo Championships.

Individual

Team

Sailing

Ecuador was given a reallocation boat based on being a top ranked nation not yet qualified.

Taekwondo

Ecuador qualified one athlete based on its performance at the Taekwondo Qualification Tournament.

Boys

Tennis

Ecuador qualified one athlete based on the 9 June 2014 ITF World Junior Rankings.

Singles

Doubles

Weightlifting

Ecuador qualified 1 quota in the girls' events based on the team ranking after the 2013 Weightlifting Youth World Championships. Later Ecuador qualified 1 boys' events quota based on the team ranking after the 2014 Weightlifting Youth Pan American Championships.

Boys

Girls

Wrestling

Ecuador qualified one athlete based on its performance at the 2014 Pan American Cadet Championships.

Girls

References

2014 in Ecuadorian sport
Nations at the 2014 Summer Youth Olympics
Ecuador at the Youth Olympics